Jennifer McLoud-Mann is an American mathematician known for her 2015 discovery, with Casey Mann and undergraduate student David Von Derau, of the 15th and last class of convex pentagons to tile the plane. She is a professor of mathematics at the University of Washington Bothell, where she is currently the Vice Dean of Curriculum & Instruction of the School of STEM. Beyond tiling, her research interests include knot theory and combinatorics.

Education 
McLoud-Mann is a 1997 graduate of East Central University in Oklahoma with a B.S. degree in Mathematics. She then completed a M.S. in Mathematics at the University of Arkansas in 1998.

McLoud-Mann completed her Ph.D. in 2002 from the University of Arkansas. Her dissertation in commutative algebra, supervised by Mark Ray Johnson, was titled On a Certain Family of Determinantal-Like Ideals.

Career 
Upon completing her doctorate, McLoud-Mann joined the University of Texas at Tyler faculty. In addition, she was associate dean of arts and sciences from 2009 to 2013.

In 2013, she moved to the University of Washington Bothell where she chaired the School of STEM's Engineering & Mathematics division for three years. In September 2020, she became the Associate Dean of Curriculum & Instruction for the School of STEM.

After two years of research, McLoud-Mann and research co-director Casey Mann found the 15th kind of pentagon that can tile a plane. This discovery was facilitated by undergraduate researcher David Von Derau, who automated an algorithm developed by McLoud-Mann and Mann. It was the first tile discovery in 30 years.

Awards 
McLoud-Mann won the Henry L. Alder Award for Distinguished Teaching by a Beginning College or University Mathematics Faculty Member of the Mathematical Association of America in 2008. In 2016, she was the recipient of the Distinguished Research, Scholarship, and Creative Activity award, which recognizes scholarly or creative achievement exemplifying the research-intensive education environment of the University of Washington Bothell.

Personal life 
Mcloud-Mann is Cherokee. She was the first in her family to obtain a college degree.

References

External links 

 Home page
Convex pentagons that admit i-block transitive tilings 
Pent Up: Using Pentagons to Tile a Plane

Year of birth missing (living people)
Living people
21st-century Native Americans
American people of Cherokee descent
East Central University alumni
Native American scientists
Native American women academics
American women academics
Native American academics
University of Arkansas alumni
University of Texas at Tyler faculty
University of Washington Bothell faculty
21st-century Native American women
Native American women scientists